The 1915 Missouri Tigers football team was an American football team that represented the University of Missouri in the Missouri Valley Conference (MVC) during the 1915 college football season. The team compiled a 2–5–1 record (1–3–1 against MVC opponents), finished in fifth place in the conference, and was outscored by all opponents by a combined total of 102 to 72. Henry Schulte was the head coach for the second of four seasons. The team played its home games at Rollins Field in Columbia, Missouri.

Schedule

References

Missouri
Missouri Tigers football seasons
Missouri Tigers football